The Columbia Forest Historic District is a national historic district located at Arlington County, Virginia. It is directly east of the Virginia Heights Historic District.  It contains 238 contributing buildings in a residential neighborhood in South Arlington. They were built in two phases beginning in 1942 and ending in 1945, and consist of 233 single-family dwellings contracted by the Federal government to house the families of young officers and ranking officials. They are two-story, two- and three-bay, paired brick or concrete block dwellings in the Colonial Revival-style.  They were built under the direction of the Army Corps of Engineers by the Defense Housing Corporation.

It was listed on the National Register of Historic Places in 2004.

References

Neighborhoods in Arlington County, Virginia
Residential buildings on the National Register of Historic Places in Virginia
Colonial Revival architecture in Virginia
Historic districts in Arlington County, Virginia
National Register of Historic Places in Arlington County, Virginia
Residential buildings completed in 1945
Historic districts on the National Register of Historic Places in Virginia